Cod Pond is located west of Thurman, New York. Fish species present in the lake are pickerel, sunfish, and black bullhead. There is a trail off CR-8 on the northwest shore.

References

Lakes of New York (state)
Lakes of Warren County, New York